Bokaro Public School is an English medium co-educational Higher Secondary school situated in Bokaro, Jharkhand, India. The school was established in April 1993 and it is affiliated by the Central Board of Secondary Education, New Delhi since 2006. Capt. R.C. Yadav an Ex-Army officer is the founder Director of the school. The school is run by a non-profit educational society Sainik Shikha Prachar Samiti. The motto of the school is "Work is Worship".

See also 
 Adarsh Vidya Mandir
Education in India
List of schools in India
CBSE

References

External links 
 

Schools in Jharkhand
Education in Bokaro Steel City
Educational institutions established in 1993
1993 establishments in Bihar